St Mary's Church is the Church of England parish church of Haddenham, Buckinghamshire It is a Grade I listed building.

History
Parts of the church are 12th century Norman, from when the Benedictine abbey of Rochester, Kent held the parish. The first priest was called just Gilbert.

Other parts of the building may be from the original Saxon church, including the font, which has a drawing of a dragon imprinted on it. The tower is Early English Gothic and according to experts, it is the finest demonstration of Early English in the county.

In 2008 the church had  major refurbishments, as part of the  Millennium 2 project.  A new vestry, creche and kitchen were built and the roof was repaired, along with other additions and fixings.

The astronomer William Rutter Dawes is buried in the churchyard.  Episodes of the murder mystery television series Midsomer Murders were filmed on the church grounds.

Organ
A pipe organ built by Norman and Beard of Norwich was installed in 1967. The organ had been built in 1916 for a church in London, which was bombed in the Second World War. In 2007 this was replaced because its restoration would cost more than a new instrument so a new electric organ was put in the church as part of the parish's Millennium 2 project.

Organ Specifications

The full organ specifications are as follows:
Great Organ 
 Double Diapason 16
 Open Diapason 8
 Stopped Diapason 8
 Dulciana 8
 Principal 4
 Flute 4
 Twelfth 2 2/3
 Fifteenth
 Blockflute 2
 Sesquialtera II Alterable Voice
 Mixture IV
 Orchestral Trumpet 8 Alterable Voice
 Trumpet 8
 Clarinet 8

Couplers 
 Swell to Great
 Swell to Pedal
 Great to Pedal
 Swell Tremulant
 Great Tremulant
 Gt & Pd Pistons Coupled
 Auto Pedal

Swell Organ
 Open Diapason 8
 Chimney Flute 8
 Echo Gamba 8
 Voix Celeste 8
 Principal 4
 Rohr Flute 4
 Fifteenth 2
 Larigot 1 1/3 Alterable Voice
 Mixture III
 Scharf III Alterable Voice
 Contra Fagotto 16
 Cornopean 8
 Oboe 8
 Clarion 4
 
Pistons 
 8 Pistons to Great
 8 Pistons to Swell
 8 General Pistons
 3 Reversers
 
Set & Cancel Pistons
 8 toe pistons duplicating generals
 Stop sequencer system with 16 pages and 8 steps per page
 Sequencer Advance thumb piston in Swell key slip

Audio
 6 Audio channels
 Full range speakers South wall

Pedal Organ 
 Contra Bourdon 32 Alterable Voice
 Open Diapason 16
 Subbass 16
 Bourdon 16
 Octave 8
 Gedackt 8
 Choral Bass 4
 Flute 4
 Trombone 16
 Trumpet 8 Alterable Voice

Features
 Two Expression Pedals
 Alternative Voicing Programme
 64-Stop Library
 Alesis reverberation unit (characteristics selectable via keyboard commands)
 Wind noise and wind robbing effects
 Full MIDI interface
 Multi LED display showing capture system status, library stop selection and sequencer function
 12 different tuning Temperaments
 Theatre Tremulant switch
 Headphone socket
 Transposer and fine tuning control
 Two additional alterable-voice specifications controlled by pistons (German and French)
 Five different tunings for celeste
 14 speed and 8 depth variations for tremulants
 Organ Console finished in dark oak"

References

Further reading

External links

St Mary's, Haddenham

Church of England church buildings in Buckinghamshire
Diocese of Oxford